Herman Waldmann FRS FMedSci (born 27 February 1945) is a British immunologist known for his work on therapeutic monoclonal antibodies. As of 2013, he is Emeritus Professor of Pathology at the Sir William Dunn School of Pathology at the University of Oxford.

Career and research
Waldmann grew up in north-east London, and was a student at the Sir George Monoux Grammar School, Walthamstow and Sidney Sussex College, Cambridge. He worked in the Department of Pathology of the University of Cambridge from 1973, becoming head of the Immunology Division in 1989. In 1994, he took up the position of head of the Sir William Dunn School of Pathology at the University of Oxford. He is a fellow of Lincoln College.

Waldmann's research has focused on immunological tolerance and the harnessing of tolerance mechanisms to treat autoimmune diseases and enable transplant acceptance. He is best known for his work on therapeutic monoclonal antibodies and their use to achieve tolerance, particularly Campath-1, now licensed as Lemtrada  for the treatment of Multiple Sclerosis.

Awards and honours
Waldmann was elected a Fellow of the Royal Society in 1990. He delivered the 1992 Bradshaw Lecture at the Royal College of Physicians. In 1998, he was a founding fellow  of the Academy of Medical Sciences. In 2008, he was awarded an honorary doctorate ScD(Hon) by the University of Cambridge. In 2010 he became a Fellow of the Royal College of Physicians (FRCP). In 2005 he received  the Jose Carreras award from the European Hematology Association and also, the Excellence in Clinical Research Award from the Juvenile Diabetes Research Foundation. In 2007 he was awarded Thomas E Starzl Prize in Surgery and Immunology, and also, the Scrip Lifetime Achievement award from the Pharmaceutical industry. He is an  honorary fellow of Queen Mary Westfield College,  and of both King's College and Sidney Sussex College, Cambridge.
He is an honorary member of the British Society for Immunology.

References

External links
 Biography at ISI Highly Cited Researchers
 Sir William Dunn School of Pathology Therapeutic Immunology Group—photo, links to CV & publications list
 From laboratory to clinic: the story of CAMPATH-1 (Geoff Hale and Herman Waldmann)

1945 births
Living people
Alumni of Sidney Sussex College, Cambridge
British immunologists
Fellows of the Royal Society
Fellows of the Academy of Medical Sciences (United Kingdom)
Fellows of Lincoln College, Oxford
Statutory Professors of the University of Oxford